The 2016–17 Regional One Day Cup was a  List A cricket tournament in Pakistan. The competition ran from 8 to 27 January 2017. The final was played between Karachi Whites and Peshawar, with Peshawar winning by 124 runs.

Teams
The following teams are competing:

 Federally Administered Tribal Areas
 Islamabad
 Karachi Blues
 Karachi Whites
 Lahore Blues
 Lahore Whites
 Peshawar
 Rawalpindi

Points table

 Teams qualified for the finals

Fixtures

Round-robin

Finals

References

External links
 Series home at ESPN Cricinfo

2017 in Pakistani cricket
Domestic cricket competitions in 2016–17
2016-17 Regional One Day Cup